Kanaganakoppa is a small village in Chikkaballapur district of Karnataka, India, 73 km from Bangalore. The name Kanaganakoppa is came from the words "Kanakana Koppa". Kanaka which means treasure of gold filled in joggery making vessels.  village is on the River basin "Utthara pinakini" and on Mallapuram-Mangalore national highway NH267. it is located between Chikkaballapur and Gowribidanur and bordering both talluks. Kanaganakoppa village consisting of more than 300 houses, main source of income is agriculture and sericulture.

Village has rwligious temples like Godess Maheshwari, Gangamma, Pillekamma, and Anjaneya temple. Every alternate year they celebrate the poja ceremony in a grand way.

Well connected road and a good weather all over the year.

Village has a Govt primary school where kids can study from Nursery to class 5 . 

Villagers have main source of income form Agriculture and Dairy farming. 
They harvest crops like maize, rice, corn, and variety of vegetables along with season flowers.
All castes of people leaving in harmony from many decades mainly Kuruba, Sadara, Vokkaliga, Ediga, scheduled castes and tribes.

Villages in Chikkaballapur district